Owlett is a surname. Notable people with the surname include:

Carolyn Owlett (born 1984), British model, actress, presenter, broadcast journalist, producer, and singer/songwriter
Clint Owlett, American politician
Jack Owlett (born 1995), Scottish rugby union player